Polytechnic High School, or Poly High School, is a common name given to high schools, especially high schools with a focus on technology as well as applied arts and sciences.

In the United States Polytechnic High School may refer to (by state);
International Polytechnic High School, in Pomona, California
John H. Francis Polytechnic High School, in Los Angeles, California
Long Beach Polytechnic High School, in Long Beach, California
Polytechnic High School (Arizona), in Mesa, Arizona
Polytechnic School, a private college preparatory school in Pasadena, California
Riverside Polytechnic High School, in Riverside, California
San Francisco Polytechnic High School, in San Francisco, California
Purdue Polytechnic High Schools, in Indiana (Indianapolis, Broad Ripple, and South Bend)
Baltimore Polytechnic Institute, in Baltimore, Maryland
Benson Polytechnic High School, in Portland, Oregon
Polytechnic High School (Fort Worth, Texas)

See also
 Polytechnic (disambiguation)
 Polytechnic Secondary School